Eino Tamberg (27 May 1930 – 24 December 2010) was an Estonian composer whose works are performed internationally. He composed operas such as Cyrano de Bergerac, four symphonies, and several concertos. He taught composition for decades at the Estonian Academy of Music.

Life 
Tamberg was born in Tallinn. He studied composition with Eugen Kapp at the Tallinn Conservatory, graduating in 1953. He worked as music director at the Tallinn Drama Theatre from 1952, and as sound engineer for the Estonian Radio from 1953 to 1957. As a composer, he first became known with his song cycle  (1955) based on poetry by Sándor Petőfi, and with his Concerto Grosso (1956), for which he won a gold medal at an international music festival in Moscow. Tamberg was an important initiator of the anti-romantic composition movement of the late 1950s. His vision on music composition belonged to the so-called New Wave in Estonian music. He became more known outside Estonia from approximately 1960, writing music for a large variety of genres, but in particular music for theatre and symphonic music.

Since 1969, he taught at the Estonian Academy of Music, where he was appointed professor in 1983. Among his students were Raimo Kangro, Margo Kõlar, Urmas Lattikas, Alo Mattiisen, Toivo Tulev, Peeter Vähi and Mari Vihmand. For the 1997/98 season he was composer-in-residence with the Estonian National Symphony Orchestra. He died in Tallinn.

Work 
Tamberg was one of the most important representatives of neoclassicism in Estonian music, though his later works were more expressionistic in style. Two of Tamberg's notable works are the ballet Joanna tentata (1971) and the Trumpet Concerto No. 1 (1972). The Trumpet Concerto remains one of his most popular works and was performed not only in Europe, but also in Hong Kong and Singapore, and was recorded by Håkan Hardenberger. Tamberg also wrote four symphonies, a violin concerto (1981), saxophone concerto (1987), clarinet concerto (1996), a second trumpet concerto (1997), bassoon concerto (2000) and cello concerto (2001). 

His second opera, Cyrano de Bergerac premiered in 1976. This romantic work shows the influence of early Baroque conventions and bel canto singing. It consists of three acts and an epilogue (Op. 45) and was written in 1974 using a libretto by Jaan Kross, based on the play by Edmond Rostand.

On the occasion of the 50th anniversary of the United Nations in 1995, he wrote his Celebration Fanfares, premiered in New York City conducted by Neeme Järvi. He was awarded an Estonian State Cultural Award in 2007 for his lifetime achievements.

Compositions 
  (Prince Gabriel), suite, 1955
 Concerto Grosso, Op. 5, 1956
 Ballet Symphony, 1959
  (The Boy and the Butterfly), ballet, 1963
  (Iron Home), opera, 1965
 Music for the film  (To the Cold Land), 1965
 Joanna tentata, ballet, 1970
 Trumpet Concerto, 1972
 Cyrano de Bergerac, opera, 1974
 Symphony No. 1, 1978
 Amores, oratorio, 1981
 Symphony No. 2, 1982
 Lend (The Fly), opera, 1983
 Symphony No. 3, 1987
 Fanfare (Celebration Fanfares), 1995
 Sentimental Journey with a Clarinet,  1996
 Desiderium Concordia (Longing for Unity), after 1997
 Symphony No. 4, 1998

References

External links 
 

1930 births
2010 deaths
Estonian opera composers
Male classical composers
Male opera composers
Musicians from Tallinn
Recipients of the Order of the National Coat of Arms, 4th Class
Estonian Academy of Music and Theatre alumni
20th-century Estonian composers
20th-century male musicians
Soviet composers